The silver gull (Chroicocephalus novaehollandiae)  is the most common gull of Australia. It has been found throughout the continent, but particularly at or near coastal areas. It is smaller than the Pacific gull (Larus pacificus), which also lives in Australia.

The silver gull should not be confused with the herring gull, which is called "silver gull" in many other languages (scientific name Larus argentatus, German Silbermöwe, French Goéland argenté, Dutch zilvermeeuw), but is a much larger, robust gull with no overlap in range.

Taxonomy
It has traditionally been placed in the genus Larus, as is the case with many gulls, but is now placed in the genus Chroicocephalus. Hartlaub's gull (C. hartlaubii) of South Africa was formerly sometimes considered to be subspecies of the silver gull.

There are three subspecies:
 C. n. forsteri (Mathews, 1912) – north and northeast Australia, New Caledonia, Loyalty Islands	
 C. n. novaehollandiae (Stephens, 1826) – southern Australia and Tasmania
 C. n. scopulinus (Forster, JR, 1844) or red-billed gull – New Zealand

Description

The head, body, and tail are white. The wings are light grey with white-spotted, black tips. Adults range from 40–45 cm (15-17 Inches) in length. Mean wingspan is 94 cm (37 Inches) .
Juveniles have brown patterns on their wings, and a dark beak. Adults have bright red beaks—the brighter the red, the older the bird.

Distribution and habitat
Silver gulls are found in all states of Australia, as well as New Zealand and New Caledonia. It is a common species, having adapted well to urban environments and thriving around shopping centres and garbage dumps. Their successful adaption to urban habitats have seen their population increase in areas of human activity, with the availability of nesting grounds the only limiting factor on population growth.

Silver gulls have twice been recorded in the United States; one bird was shot in August 1947 at the mouth of the Genesee River, Lake Ontario, and another was photographed in Salem County, New Jersey, in autumn 1996. Both are believed to have escaped from captivity.

Behaviour

The silver gull has a sharp voice consisting of a variety of calls. The most common call is a harsh, high pitched 'kwarwh'.

Feeding
The silver gull naturally feeds on worms, fish, insects and crustaceans. It is a successful scavenger, allowing increased numbers near human settlements. It is known to pester humans for scraps and steal unattended food.

Breeding
Breeding occurs from August to December, typically in large colonies on offshore islands. The nest is located on the ground and consists of seaweed, roots, and plant stems. The nests may be found in low shrubs, rocks and jetties. Typical clutch size is one to three eggs. Often two broods are raised in a year, and both adults share nest-building, incubation and feeding.

Various views and plumages

References

Further reading
Harrison, Peter (1988): Seabirds (2nd ed.). Christopher Helm, London. 
 Pons J.M., Hassanin, A., and Crochet P.A.(2005). Phylogenetic relationships within the Laridae (Charadriiformes: Aves) inferred from mitochondrial markers. Molecular Phylogenetics and Evolution 37(3):686-699

silver gull
Birds of Australia
Birds of New Zealand
Birds of New Caledonia
silver gull
Articles containing video clips
Taxa named by James Francis Stephens
Taxobox binomials not recognized by IUCN